Churk Ghurma is a town and a nagar panchayat in Sonbhadra district  in the state of Uttar Pradesh, India. The town is famous for a cement factory which was previously owned by state government. Later, the factory was sold to Jaypee Cements.

Demographics
 India census, Churk Ghurma had a population of 8,685. Males constitute 53% of the population and females 47%. Churk Ghurma has an average literacy rate of 70%, higher than the national average of 59.5%: male literacy is 79% and, female literacy is 61%. In Churk Ghurma, 14% of the population is under 6 years of age.

Climate

References

kaimur wildlife sanctuary

Cities and towns in Sonbhadra district